The 1952 season was the 29th season of the Slovenian Republic League and the 7th while Slovenia was a part of Yugoslavia. The top four clubs were granted a place in the second level inter-republic Slovene-Croatian League. The Slovenian Republic League was split into West and East divisions in the following season.

Final table

Qualifications for the Yugoslav First League

External links
Football Association of Slovenia 

Slovenian Republic Football League seasons
Yugo
3
Yugo
3
Football